The Commonwealth Stakes is a Grade III American Thoroughbred horse race for horses that are four years old or older, over a distance of seven furlongs on the dirt held annually in early April at Keeneland Race Course, Lexington, Kentucky during the spring meeting.  The event currently carries a purse of $300,000.

History

The inaugural running of the event was on 16 October 1987, during Keeneland's fall meeting as the Commonwealth Breeders' Cup Stakes as a six furlong dirt sprint for three year olds and older and was won by Exclusive Enough who was ridden by US Hall of Fame jockey Mike E. Smith. Exclusive Enough equaled the track record with his winning time of 1:08 and to date is the only three year old to have won the event.

Between 1987 and 2007, the Breeders' Cup sponsored the event which reflected in the name of the event.

Two years later, in 1989 Keeneland moved the event to their spring meeting in April and increased the distance to seven furlongs and changed the conditions of the event to only allow four year olds and older. 

The following year in 1990 the event was upgraded to Grade III status and in 1994 the event was upgraded once more Grade II.

Between 2007 and 2014 the event was held on the synthetic Polytrack surface.

In 2013 the event was downgraded to a Grade III event.

The event was not held 2020 during Keeneland's spring meeting which was moved to July and shortened due to the COVID-19 pandemic in the United States.

Records
Speed record
 1:20.40 – Distorted Humor (1998)

Margins
 6 lengths –  Calestoga (1988)

Most wins
 2 – Black Tie Affair (1990, 1991)

Most wins by a jockey
 3 – Edgar Prado (2001, 2003, 2008)
 3 – Joel Rosario (2012, 2017, 2021)

Most wins by a trainer
 3 – Todd A. Pletcher (2003, 2004, 2011)

Most wins by an owner
 2 – Jeff Sullivan (1990, 1991)
 2 – Michael B. Tabor (2003, 2004)

Winners

Legend:

See also 
 List of American and Canadian Graded races

External links 
 2021 Keeneland Media Guide

References

Graded stakes races in the United States
Grade 3 stakes races in the United States
Open mile category horse races
Keeneland horse races
Recurring sporting events established in 1987
1987 establishments in Kentucky